Josiah Smith (1738–1803) was an American politician.

Josiah Smith may also refer to:

 Josiah Smith (clergyman) (1704–1781), clergyman in colonial South Carolina
 Josiah William Smith (1816–1887), English barrister, legal writer and judge